Muhammad Beg Khan-e Rosebahani was Qiladar and Jagirdar of Banganapalle. He was a supposed uncle of Imad ul-Mulk, Nawab Khwaja Muhammad Mubariz Khan Bahadur, Hizbar Jang, sometime Subadar of the Deccan and Wazir. In 1665, he was appointed as Qiladar of Banganapalle Fort and granted the surrounding districts in jagir by the Sultan of Bijapur. He died in 1686.

Titles held

See also
Nawab of Carnatic
Nawab of Masulipatam
Nawab of Banganapalle

References

1686 deaths
Year of birth unknown